Reed B. Wickner (born c. 1942) is an American yeast geneticist. In 1994 he proposed that the [PSI+] and [URE3] phenotypes in Saccharomyces cerevisiae, a form of budding yeast, were caused by prion forms of native proteins - specifically, the Sup35p and Ure2p proteins, respectively.

Wickner graduated from Cornell University with a B.A. degree in 1962. He then went to medical school at Georgetown University and received his M.D. degree in 1966. He is a member of the National Academy of Sciences (NAS), the American Academy of Arts and Sciences [(AAAS)], and the American Academy of Microbiology, and has been a fellow of the American Association for the Advancement of Science.  He is (as of 2012) Chief of the Laboratory of Biochemistry and Genetics at the National Institute of Diabetes & Digestive & Kidney Diseases, part of the National Institutes of Health. His research interests pertain to prions and amyloid diseases.

References

American geneticists
Cornell University alumni
Members of the United States National Academy of Sciences
1940s births
Living people
Georgetown University School of Medicine alumni
National Institutes of Health people
Fellows of the American Association for the Advancement of Science